KOOS (107.3 FM) is a radio station in North Bend, Oregon, United States.  The station is owned by Bicoastal Media.  KOOS airs a hot adult contemporary music format.

External links

OOS
Hot adult contemporary radio stations in the United States
Radio stations established in 1990
1990 establishments in Oregon
North Bend, Oregon